Jining is a prefecture-level city in southwestern Shandong province. It borders Heze to the southwest, Zaozhuang to the southeast, Tai'an to the northeast, and the provinces of Henan and Jiangsu to the northwest and south respectively. Jining, which is located directly to the north of Lake Nanyang, is today the northernmost city reachable by navigation on the Grand Canal of China making it an important inland port.

History

The name Jining was first given to the region in the year 1271 during the Song dynasty, although the exact area and type of administrative district it refers to have varied over the centuries. Jining has several distinctive associations in Chinese history and culture, as in antiquity it was the birthplace and home of Confucius, along with many of his more famous disciples, including Mencius. Temples to a number of these philosophers still exist in various parts of the prefecture. Liangshan, a county of Jining, is also famous as the principal setting of the Chinese literary classic, Water Margin.

COVID-19 outbreak

In 2020, the Shandong government reported that a prison guard at Rencheng jail in Jining had shown COVID-19 symptoms in early February and that subsequently more than 2,000 inmates and staff were tested, with 200 prisoners and seven officers coming back positive. 
The provincial government said Xie Weijun, party secretary for Shandong's department of justice, and seven prison officials had been fired for mismanagement of the outbreak.

Administration

The prefecture-level city of Jining administers 11 county-level divisions, including two districts, two county-level cities and seven counties.

Rencheng District
Yanzhou District
Qufu City
Zoucheng City
Weishan County
Yutai County - originally in Huxi prefecture
Jinxiang County - originally in Huxi
Jiaxiang County - originally in Huxi
Wenshang County
Sishui County
Liangshan County

Climate

Economy

Jining is situated in a coal mining area in the southwest of Shandong. An industrial city, Jining has a coal-fired power station, the Jining Power Plant. The city is served by Jining Qufu Airport.

Notable people

Confucius (551 – 479 BC), central Chinese thinker, founder of Confucianism (main temple and tomb in Qufu)
Zengzi (505 BC - 436 BC), Chinese philosopher and author, principal lineage protector and promoter of Confucianism
Mencius (372 – 289 BC), Chinese thinker, a principal interpreter of Confucianism (main temple in Zoucheng)
Yan Hui (521 BC - 490 BC), one of the famous disciples of Confucius (temple in Qufu)
Lu Ban (507–440 BC), Chinese engineer, philosopher, inventor, military thinker
Zuo Qiuming (5th century BC), Chinese court writer of the State of Lu, and contemporary of Confucius during the Spring and Autumn period.
Kong Shangren (1648–1718), a Chinese Qing Dynasty dramatist and poet best known for his chuanqi play The Peach-Blossom Fan
Qiao Yu (1927–), a famous Chinese modern songwriter and play writer.
Pan Xiaoting (1982–), the first professional pool player from China to play full-time on the WPBA Tour.
Xiong Jingnan (1988–), the first ever Chinese World Champion in mixed martial arts history.

Sister cities

  Ashikaga, Tochigi, Japan (1984)
  Lawton, Oklahoma, United States (1995)
  Mulhouse, Haut-Rhin, France (1996)
  Komatsu, Ishikawa, Japan (2008)
  Taganrog, Rostov Oblast, Russia (2009)
  Osasco, São Paulo, Brazil (2010)
  Fort Smith, Arkansas, United States (2012)
  Angra do Heroísmo, Açores, Portugal (2015)
  Springfield, Illinois, United States (2019)

References

External links

Government website of Jining (available in Chinese and English)

 
Cities in Shandong
Prefecture-level divisions of Shandong
Port cities and towns in China

sr:Jining